The extreme points of India include the coordinates that are further north, south, east or west than any other location in India; and the highest and the lowest altitudes in the country. The northernmost point claimed by India is in territory disputed between India and Pakistan, but administered by the latter. With the exception of Kanyakumari (Cape Comorin), the southernmost location of mainland India, all other extreme locations are uninhabited.

The latitude and longitude are expressed in decimal degree notation, in which a positive latitude value refers to the northern hemisphere, and a negative value refers to the southern hemisphere. Similarly, a positive longitude value refers to the eastern hemisphere, and a negative value refers to the western hemisphere. The coordinates used in this article are sourced from Google Earth, which makes use of the WGS84 geodetic reference system. Additionally, a negative altitude value refers to land below sea level.

Extreme points

The northernmost point claimed by India lies in the Pakistani-administered territory of Gilgit-Baltistan, which India claims as a part of the union territory of Ladakh. The northernmost point administered by India lies in the union territory of Ladakh, which is claimed by Pakistan as a part of the autonomous territory of Azad Kashmir. This list provides the northernmost point as claimed by India; the northernmost disputed point that is administered by India; and the northernmost undisputed point in India. This case also applies to the highest elevated regions.

India's easternmost state is Arunachal Pradesh. Part of the state is claimed by China as part of Tibet Autonomous Region, though administered by India, The easternmost of Indian-administered territory is located in this disputed region. Consequently, this list mentions both the disputed and undisputed easternmost points in India. 

All astronomical calculations are performed with respect to a Central Station at longitude 82°30’ East, latitude 23°11’ North.

Altitudes

See also
 India related 
 Borders of India
 Geography of India
 Extreme points of Asia
 Exclusive economic zone of India
 List of disputed territories of India 
 Outline of India

 Other related topics
 Extreme points of Indonesia
 Extreme points of Myanmar
 Extreme points of Bangladesh
 Extreme points of Thailand

Notes

References

Extreme points
India
Extreme points
Geography of India